Deodoro, also known as Marshal Deodoro, was a coastal defense ship built for the Brazilian Navy at the end of the nineteenth century. It was the lead ship of its class, alongside . Deodoro was one of several ships to rebel in the 1910 Revolt of the Lash, and it was used for neutrality patrols during the First World War. It was sold to Mexico in 1924, and broken up for scrap in 1938.

Service 
Deodoro was laid down by the French shipbuilding company Société Nouvelle des Forges et Chantiers de la Méditerranée in 1896, supervised by Admiral José Cândido Guillobel. Its construction was temporarily suspended by the Brazilians while they modified its design. It was launched on 18 June 1898, after a ceremony that was attended by representatives from Brazil, the French Navy, and a Russian gunboat. Its christening was accomplished with an electric button, which sent a signal to cut a cord and let a bottle of champagne break on the ship. At the beginning of the Spanish–American War (1898), officials from both participants traveled to France to inspect the incomplete Deodoro and sister ship Floriano in view of purchasing them for the conflict. Neither was close enough to completion to make such an acquisition worthwhile.

After the ship was handed over to Brazil, the ship left France en route for Brazil, stopping along the way in the Spanish Canary Islands. A nearby British warship, which was at that time engaged in the Second Boer War, suspected the ship of being a Boer-chartered privateer heading south to interfere with British merchant ships plying along the coast of southern Africa. Although the Brazilians were able to convince the British of their identity, they steamed with lights off for the next night or two in an effort to avoid further confusion with any other warships. Deodoro arrived in Brazil on 18 February 1900.

Six years later, its own crew rebelled as part of the Revolt of the Lash. The Brazilian Navy at the time was heavily segregated between white officers and a broadly black or mulatto enlisted sailors, and the former would often violently punish the latter for even minor transgressions. Tensions came to a head in November 1910, when sailors aboard the new dreadnought  rebelled, and the crews of Deodoro, another new dreadnought, a new cruiser, and several smaller vessels joined. The revolt ended peacefully, and the mutineers were granted an amnesty that was later cancelled.

In 1912, the Brazilian Navy overhauled Deodoro in Rio de Janeiro, fitting a new propulsion system and armament. In September and October 1913, the ship took part in a major naval exercise with the majority of the Brazilian fleet, which was observed by the country's president, naval minister, and other politicians.

During the First World War, the navy placed Deodoro in its northern squadron, which was responsible for neutrality patrols in the area between the states of Amazonas (located up the Amazon River) and Sergipe. Deodoro, the detachment's flagship, was joined in this task by Floriano, two cruisers, two destroyers, and the six vessels of Brazil's Amazon River flotilla.

On 19 April 1924, Brazil sold the ship to the Mexican Navy, where it was renamed Anáhuac. The Brazilians used the money gained (eight thousand contos) to purchase a submarine from Italy, . No further upgrades were made to Anáhuac in its remaining service life, and the Mexican Navy sold it for scrap in 1938.

Footnotes

Endnotes

Bibliography 
 Brassey, TA, ed. The Naval Annual, 1897. Portsmouth: J Griffin and Company, 1897. .
 Brassey, TA, ed. The Naval Annual, 1900. Portsmouth: J Griffin and Company, 1900. .
 "Deodoro." Serviço de Documentação da Marinha — Histórico de Navios. Diretoria do Patrimônio Histórico e Documentação da Marinha, Departamento de História Marítima. Accessed 19 August 2017.
 "Encouraçado Guarda-Costas Deodoro." Navios De Guerra Brasileiros. Accessed 28 August 2017.
 Gardiner, Robert, and Roger Chesneau, eds. Conway's All The World's Fighting Ships 1922–1946. London: Conway Maritime Press, 1980. . .
 Gardiner, Robert and Randal Gray, eds. Conway's All the World's Fighting Ships 1906–1921. Annapolis: Naval Institute Press, 1985. . .
 
 Morgan, Zachary R. Legacy of the Lash: Race and Corporal Punishment in the Brazilian Navy and the Atlantic World. Bloomington: Indiana University Press, 2014. . .
 "Notes and Queries of Service Afloat and Ashore," Navy & Army Illustrated 6, no. 76 (16 July 1898), 401.
 Scheina, Robert. Latin America: A Naval History, 1810–1987. Annapolis, MD: Naval Institute Press, 1987. . .
 "The New Brazilian Armorclad 'Marshal Deodoro'," Scientific American 82, no. 12 (24 March 1900), 184.

Further reading 
 "The Cruise of the 'Deodoro' and 'Floriano'." Revista Maritima Brasileira. September–October 1903. 
 Paloczi-Horvath, George. From Monitor to Missile Boat: Coast Defence Ships and Coastal Defence Since 1860. Annapolis: Naval Institute Press, 1996. . .

Ships of the Brazilian Navy
Marshal Deodoro-class coastal defense ship
1898 ships
Ships built in France
Cruisers of Mexico
Naval ships of Mexico